David Edward Johnson (23 October 1951 – 23 November 2022) was an English professional footballer and manager who played as a forward and won major trophies for Liverpool in the 1970s and 1980s. He also played for Ipswich Town, Everton and other clubs, as well as the England national team.

Career

Everton
Johnson signed for Liverpool rivals Everton as a youngster and after showing his ability in early matches, Liverpool manager Bill Shankly pestered Everton counterpart Harry Catterick to sell the young striker, but was rebuffed.

Johnson made his Everton debut as a 19-year-old on 8 January 1971 in a 2–2 league draw with Burnley at Turf Moor. Later on in 1971 Johnson scored in a Merseyside derby game for Everton.

Ipswich Town
Johnson joined Bobby Robson's Ipswich Town in the November 1972 swapping for Ipswich's top goalscorer, Rod Belfitt (and £40,000). He made his Ipswich debut on 4 November 1972 at Portman Road in a 2–2 draw with Leeds United. His first goal for the club came on 2 December the same year in the 1–1 draw with Manchester City at Maine Road. By the end of his first season Johnson had helped Ipswich to the Texaco Cup final where they met East Anglian derby rivals Norwich City. After the two legged final Ipswich emerged victorious, winning 4–2 on aggregate by winning both legs 2–1.

The following season Ipswich drew Spanish giants Real Madrid in the first round of the UEFA Cup. Ipswich beat their illustrious counterparts by a goal to nil at home and held Real to a goalless draw at the Bernabéu in front of 80,000 supporters. In the next round Italian side S.S. Lazio. 4–0 down with just 20 minutes remaining, Johnson had the ball when Giancarlo Oddi went to close him down. Oddi then put in a waist high challenge which left Johnson in a heap on the ground holding his groin. Johnson had to be stretchered off and missed the following three fixtures as a consequence.

Johnson returned from the injury for the return leg in Rome and took up his place on the bench. He watched as Lazio scored early and then again before half-time. A penalty was despatched by Colin Viljoen for Ipswich. Lazio then scored two more goals to put the tie back in the balance. In the 88th minute with the score 5–4 on aggregate, Robson turned to Johnson. With virtually his first touch he scored the goal that would finally settle the tie in Ipswich's favour. Ipswich beat Dutch side FC Twente in the next round but went out in the quarter finals to East German side Locomotiv Leipzig 4–3 on penalties after the sides had drawn 1–1 during normal and extra time.

Johnson scored 35 goals in his four seasons at the club as a battling, play-linking forward forging a productive partnership with Trevor Whymark. It was during his time at Ipswich that Johnson was called up by Don Revie for his first cap for England. He made his debut in a British Home Championship match at Wembley on 21 May 1975. Wales were the visitors with the game ending 2–2 with Johnson scoring both the goals. He also scored twice in a 3–1 victory over world champions Argentina at Wembley, a game which saw the first appearance in England of Diego Maradona. Johnson was in Ron Greenwood's squad for the 1980 European Championships but found himself behind Garry Birtles and the man that replaced him at Ipswich Paul Mariner. He won eight caps scoring six times in those appearances.

In 1976 Tottenham Hotspur put in an unsuccessful bid for around £200,000 for Johnson did not want to move. However, after 137 league appearances for Ipswich he returned to Merseyside.

Liverpool
Johnson signed for Liverpool for a club record fee of £200,000. He made his debut for the club on 21 August 1976 in a 1–0 league win over Norwich at Anfield. He scored his first goal a week later on the 28th, but his goal was not enough to prevent Birmingham City beating Liverpool 2–1 at St Andrews.

In his first season, he was a frequent substitute, vying for the right to partner Kevin Keegan with both John Toshack and David Fairclough. In his debut season Liverpool were chasing an historic treble of League championship, FA Cup and European Cup as the season drew to a close.

Johnson picked up his first domestic honour with the League title and was selected as Keegan's strike partner for the 1977 FA Cup Final at Wembley, but Liverpool lost 2–1 to Manchester United. Johnson made little impact and was substituted by Ian Callaghan in the second half.

For the 1977 European Cup final against Borussia Mönchengladbach in Rome three days later, manager Bob Paisley kept the team that had ended the match at Wembley, so Callaghan started and Johnson was on the bench. He picked up a medal as Liverpool won 3–1.

In April 1978, Johnson scored for Liverpool in the Merseyside derby at Goodison Park – becoming the very first player to score for both clubs in the Merseyside derby. As of 2018, only one other player – Peter Beardsley – has achieved this feat since.

In 1979 and 1980 Johnson was a free-scoring centre forward as Liverpool regained and then retained the title, and in 1981 he played as Liverpool won their third European Cup (against Real Madrid in the final) and their first League Cup (against West Ham United). However, a sign of things to come was in that first League Cup success. After the first game at Wembley ended 1–1, Johnson was on the bench for the replay because of Paisley's decision to try out the young Ian Rush. Rush did not score but played well, and the following year he was the regular partner to Kenny Dalglish with Johnson being used less frequently.

Johnson did enough to win a final league championship medal in 1982 and also won the League Cup again, after getting the substitute's jersey for the final (against Tottenham Hotspur).

Return to Everton and loan to Barnsley
Johnson returned to Everton in August 1982 for £100,000. He did not see out his second season at Goodison after initially being loaned to Barnsley.

Later career
Johnson ended the 1983–84 season at Manchester City before spending the summer at American side Tulsa Roughnecks in the NASL. His last season of senior football was played at Preston North End. He then had a spell as player manager at Barrow AFC.

After playing
Johnson worked at Anfield, hosting in the corporate lounges. He could also be heard regularly on BBC Radio Merseyside as both a match summariser and also a regular contributor to the station's Red Alert programme aired on Fridays at 7.30 pm where he provided what was known during the show as "The Doc's Diagnosis".

Johnson died of throat cancer on 23 November 2022, at the age of 71.

Honours
Ipswich Town
 Texaco Cup: 1973

Liverpool
 Football League First Division: 1976–77, 1978–79, 1979–80, 1981–82
 Football League Cup: 1980–81, 1981–82
 FA Charity Shield: 1976, 1977 (shared), 1979, 1980
 European Cup: 1976–77, 1977–78, 1980–81
 UEFA Super Cup: 1977

Individual
Football League First Division PFA Team of the Year: 1979–80
Ipswich Town Hall of Fame: Inducted 2016

References

External links
Player profile at LFChistory.net
England Record
Everton appearances 1968/69-1972/73 & 1982/83-1983/84 at Sporting heroes.net
Ipswich Town biography part 1 1972–74 at Sporting-heroes.net
Ipswich Town biography part 2 1974–76 at Sporting-heroes.net
Liverpool appearances Part 1 1976/77-1978/79 at Sporting heroes.net
Liverpool appearances Part 1 1979/80-1981/82 at Sporting heroes.net
England biography 1975–80 at Sporting-heroes.net

1951 births
2022 deaths 
Deaths from throat cancer
English footballers
English expatriate footballers
England international footballers
England under-23 international footballers
Everton F.C. players
Ipswich Town F.C. players
Liverpool F.C. players
Manchester City F.C. players
Barnsley F.C. players
Tulsa Roughnecks (1978–1984) players
Preston North End F.C. players
Barrow A.F.C. players
Naxxar Lions F.C. players
UEFA Euro 1980 players
North American Soccer League (1968–1984) players
Expatriate soccer players in the United States
Footballers from Liverpool
Association football forwards
English football managers
Barrow A.F.C. managers
English expatriate sportspeople in the United States
UEFA Champions League winning players
FA Cup Final players